Vashian or Vashiyan or Vasheyan ( may refer to:

Vashian-e Chah-e Shirin
Vashian-e Cheshmeh Shirin
Vashian-e Karim Hoseyn
Vashian-e Nasir Tappeh
Vashian-e Nosrati
Vashian-e Takht Shir